The Handball-Bundesliga (HBL) is the top German professional handball league. From 2007 onwards, the league was sponsored by Toyota and has officially been called the Toyota Handball-Bundesliga. This lasted until 2012 when the Deutsche Kreditbank AG (DKB) became the new sponsor. The official name has consequently been changed to LIQUY MOLY Handball-Bundesliga. The winners of the respective season are the official German handball champions.
HBL is headquartered in Dortmund.

History
The Bundesliga was introduced with the 1966/67 season and initially operated with two regional sections, North and South. Since 1977 the Bundesliga has operated with a single section first division, currently composed of eighteen clubs. In 1981 a 2.Bundesliga was introduced as a new second division, supplanting the Regionalliga which became the third tier. The 2.Bundesliga used to consist of two (resp. three in the first two years after the German reunification) sections north and south for thirty years. Starting with the 2011/12 season the 2.Bundesliga is run in a single section consisting of twenty teams.

Season
The season has 34 game days (or weeks) and is played as a Round-robin tournament without playoffs or a final. The season starts in August or September and ends in May.
The first and second placed teams are entitled to play in the EHF Champions League the following season. The third, fourth, fifth and sixth placed teams additionally play in the EHF European League. The seedings are subject to change, in case a German team wins the Champions League, the EHF European League or the EHF Cup Winner's Cup because each winner of those tournaments is granted an automatic start in next years tournament without taking one of the leagues spots. It also can change if the DHB-Pokal Champion has one of the league spots for the Champions League or the EHF European League.

Relegation and Promotion

Until 2011, the two last placed teams would be relegated to the 2. Handball-Bundesliga for the next season, either in its northern or the southern section. The sixteenth placed team used to play in a home and away decider against the winner of the decider between the two-second placed teams of the northern and the southern section of the 2. Bundesliga. The champions of the second divisions received a spot for the Bundesliga automatically.

Since the 2017–18 season, the bottom two teams of the Bundesliga will directly be relegated to the 2. Bundesliga, while the top two teams of the 2. Bundesliga will be directly promoted to the Bundesliga.

Clubs
Members of the 2022–23 Handball-Bundesliga.

Champions
The complete list of the German handball champions since 1950.

Total titles won

Statistics

EHF coefficients

The following data indicates German coefficient rankings between European handball leagues.

Country ranking
EHF League Ranking for 2022/23 season:

1.  (1)  Handball-Bundesliga (145.00)
2.  (3)  Liga ASOBAL (121.50)
3.  (2)  LNH Division 1 (104.33)
4.  (5)  Nemzeti Bajnokság I (94.17)
5.  (7)  Håndboldligaen (87.33)

Club ranking
EHF Club Ranking as of 3 March 2023:

 2.  THW Kiel (653)
 6.  SC Magdeburg (569)
 9.  SG Flensburg-Handewitt (493)
 13.  Füchse Berlin (422)
 26.  Rhein-Neckar Löwen (215)

References

External links

Official website 
Official website 
Statistics of the HBL

Handball-Bundesliga
1
Professional sports leagues in Germany